Quin Blanding (born May 1, 1996) is an American football safety who is a free agent. He played college football at Virginia. He signed with the Washington Redskins as an undrafted free agent in 2018.

Early years
Blanding attended Bayside High School in Virginia Beach, Virginia. In high school, he played quarterback, tight end, wide receiver, and safety.  He was rated by Rivals.com and Scout.com as a five-star recruit. Rivals had him ranked as the best safety and fifth best player overall. He committed to the University of Virginia to play college football.

College career
Blanding immediately became a true freshman in 2014. He became the first freshman to start the opening game for Virginia at safety since Tony Blount in 1976. He started all 12 games and recorded 123 tackles, which led all freshman and broke Ahmad Brooks Virginia freshman record. He also added three interceptions and one sack. After the season, he was named the ACC Defensive Rookie of the Year.

Blanding also started all twelve games in 2015 and maintained his rank of number 2 in the ACC with 115 tackles. In 2016, he broke school records, ending the season with a total of 358 tackles, putting him at number 9 in career tackles in UVA history. As the 2017 season continued, Blanding led his team into a secured bowl game, ending the Georgia Tech game with an interception.

Professional career

Washington Redskins
Blanding was signed by the Washington Redskins as an undrafted free agent on May 2, 2018. He was waived on September 1, 2018.

Carolina Panthers
On December 31, 2018, Blanding signed a reserve/future contract with the Carolina Panthers. He was waived during final roster cuts on August 31, 2019 and was signed to the practice squad the next day. He signed a reserve/future contract with the Panthers on December 30, 2019.

On September 5, 2020, Blanding was waived by the Panthers.

References

External links

Virginia Cavaliers bio
Carolina Panthers bio

1996 births
Living people
Sportspeople from Virginia Beach, Virginia
Players of American football from Virginia
American football safeties
Virginia Cavaliers football players
Washington Redskins players
Carolina Panthers players